Sanjay Bhatia (born 29 July 1967)  is a Bharatiya Janata Party politician from Haryana. He is currently an elected Member of Parliament from Karnal constituency of Haryana in 2019 Lok sabha polls and State general secretary at Bhartiya Janata Party (BJP), Haryana and former chairman, Haryana Khadi and Village Industries Board.

References 

Living people
Bharatiya Janata Party politicians from Haryana
1967 births
Panipat
India MPs 2019–present